The Skoda 100 mm Model 1916 (100 mm M.16) was a mountain howitzer used by Austria-Hungary during World War I. The Turks used a 105 mm variant, the M.16(T). The Wehrmacht redesignated this as the 10 cm GebH 16 or 16(ö). Guns acquired from Italy, after 1943, were known as 10 cm GebH 316(i); those acquired from Czechoslovakia were 10 cm GebH 16(t).  The Italians referred to weapons gained either through capture or reparations as the Obice da 100/17 modello 16. The gun could be broken into three sections, intended for towing by two animal carts. The gun crew was protected by a gun shield. The Italians used lighter shells than the Czechs, which accounts for the greater range and muzzle velocity of their guns.

Notes

References
 Chamberlain, Peter and Gander, Terry. Infantry, Mountain and Airborne Guns. New York: Arco, 1975
 Gander, Terry and Chamberlain, Peter. Weapons of the Third Reich: An Encyclopedic Survey of All Small Arms, Artillery and Special Weapons of the German Land Forces 1939-1945. New York: Doubleday, 1979

External links

Mountain artillery
World War I mountain artillery
Artillery of Czechoslovakia
World War I howitzers
World War II artillery of Italy
100 mm artillery
World War I artillery of Austria-Hungary